Host is the seventh studio album by British gothic metal band Paradise Lost.

Background and content 

Following One Second, Host saw the band moving further away from their previous metal sound to something more akin to a melancholic style of synth-pop incorporating downtempo, leftfield, and trance electronic styles. Songs were constructed primarily of programmed drums and synthesizer melodies, with simple, rock-style guitar added for choruses. Vocalist Nick Holmes resolved to simple melodies with his clean singing style, often doubled and harmonized; the resultant material resembled crossover acts like Psykosonik and electronic band Depeche Mode.

Release and promotion 

The singles "So Much Is Lost" and "Permanent Solution" both have music videos released; in an interview, Holmes and Mackintosh explained that the videos were higher budget compared to other videos they made.

Due to an injury, Gregor Mackintosh often played keyboards instead of guitar while touring the album with his guitar technician Milton "Milly" Evans playing his guitar parts.

Reaction and legacy
While the album was critically well received, opinion about it continues to be split. Holmes commented on this album in 2007, stating:

Aedy said Host is the "darkest" Paradise Lost album, but noted the band was not happy with the production. The album was remastered and re-released in 2018.

The album eventually served as the inspiration of Holmes' and Mackintosh's side-project Host; in the press release about the formation, Mackintosh noted that "We always stood by Host as an album".

Track listing

Personnel

Paradise Lost
 Nick Holmes – lead vocals and lyrics
 Gregor Mackintosh – lead guitar (tracks 1–11, 13–16), keyboards, programming, string arrangements (1, 2, 4, 6, 10, 13), and all music
 Aaron Aedy – rhythm guitar, lead guitar on "Year of Summer" 
 Steve Edmondson – bass
 Lee Morris – drums, backing vocals

Additional personnel

Cellists and other string arrangements
Audrey Riley – strings arrangements and cello (1, 4, 10)
Sally Herbert – string arrangements (2, 6, 13) 
Dinah Beamish – cello (2, 6, 13)

Violists
Sue Dench – tracks 1, 4, 10
Claire Orster – tracks 2, 6, 13

Backing vocals
Shereena Smith – chanting on "Harbour", backing vocals (4, 6, 13)

Production
Howie Weinberg – mastering
Steve Lyon – engineering, mixing, programming
Matt Cullen – engineer assistance

Album design
Paul Postle – photography 
Stylorouge – design, art direction

Violinists
On tracks 1, 4, 10
Chris Tombling 
Leo Payne 
On tracks 2, 6, 13
Anne Stephenson 
Gini Ball 
Jocelyn Pook 
Julia Singleton 
Sally Herbert

Charts

References

1999 albums
Paradise Lost (band) albums
EMI Records albums